Bodelschwingh was a noble family from Westphalia, Germany. Notable members include:
 Ernst von Bodelschwingh-Velmede (1794–1854), Prussian statesman and Minister of the Interior
 Karl von Bodelschwingh-Velmede (1800–1873), Prussian politician (brother of Ernst)
 Friedrich von Bodelschwingh, Senior (1831–1910), German theologian and founder of charitable public-health institutions (son of Ernst)
 Friedrich von Bodelschwingh, Junior (1877–1946), German theologian and public-health advocate (son of Friedrich, Senior)

See also 
 
 v. Bodelschwinghsche Anstalten Bethel, a charitable public-health institution in Bielefeld founded and led by Friedrich von Bodelschwingh, Senior, and later his son Bodelschwingh, Junior  
 Otto von Bolschwing (1909 – 1982)
 152559 Bodelschwingh, an asteroid